Events in the year 1864 in Norway.

Incumbents
Monarch: Charles IV

Events
 19 April – The last public execution in Christiania took place at Etterstad, attended by about 5,000 spectators.

Arts and literature
Ja, vi elsker, composed by Rikard Nordraak, with lyrics by Bjørnstjerne Bjørnson, becomes the (de facto) Norwegian national anthem.

Births
7 January – Rasmus Pedersen Thu, photographer (died 1946)
24 February – Anders Buen, typographer, newspaper editor, trade unionist and politician (died 1933)
13 March  – James C. M. Hanson, Norwegian American librarian and author (died 1943)
15 March – Johan Halvorsen, composer, conductor and violinist (died 1935)
21 March – Svend Rasmussen Svendsen, Norwegian American impressionist artist (died 1945)
7 June  – Emil Biorn, Norwegian American sculptor and artist (died 1935)
22 June – Hans Jørgen Darre-Jenssen, engineer, politician and Minister (died 1950)
8 July – Marie Hauge, painter (died 1931)
10 October – Ola Bertelsen, jurist and politician (died 1946)
19 September – Ragna Wettergreen, stage and film actress (died 1958)
1 December – Carsten Borchgrevink, polar explorer (died 1934)
14 December – Anders Svor, sculptor (died 1929)

Full date unknown
Gulbrand Hagen, Norwegian American newspaper editor and writer (died 1919)
Fredrik Ludvig Konow, politician and Minister (died 1954)
Johan Wilhelm Normann Munthe, soldier and art collector (died 1935)
Christian Lange Rolfsen, politician and Minister (died 1934)
Nils Collett Vogt, poet (died 1937)
Johannes B. Wist (died 1923) Norwegian American journalist and author.

Deaths
12 January – Lars Rasch, jurist and politician (born 1797)
20 March - Broder Knudtzon, merchant and politician (born 1788)
7 June – Rolf Olsen, politician (born 1818)
24 November – Ulrik Frederik Cappelen, jurist and politician (born 1797)

Full date unknown
Ola Antonson Holsen, politician (born 1808)

See also